Snyder equal-area projection is a polyhedral map projection used in the ISEA (Icosahedral Snyder Equal Area) discrete global grids. It is named for John P. Snyder, who developed the projection in the 1990s.

It is a modified Lambert azimuthal equal-area projection, most often applied to a polyhedral globe consisting of an icosahedron.

Use in the ISEA model 
As stated by Carr at al. article, page 32:

 The S in ISEA refers to John P. Snyder. He came out of retirement  specifically  to  address  projection  problems with the original  EMAP grid (see  Snyder,  1992).   He developed  the equal  area projection  that underlies  the gridding system.

 ISEA grids are simple in concept.  Begin with a Snyder Equal Area projection to a regular icosahedron (...) inscribed in a sphere.  In each of the 20 equilateral  triangle  faces  of the icosahedron inscribe a hexagon by dividing each triangle edge into thirds (...).  Then project the hexagon back onto the sphere using the Inverse  Snyder  Icosahedral  equal  area  projection.   This yields a coarse-resolution equal area grid called the resolution 1 grid. It consists of 20 hexagons on the surface of the sphere and 12 pentagons centered on the 12 vertices of the icosahedron.''

References 

Equal-area projections